Plain was a rural community 4 miles east of Tadmor in the Davy Crockett National Forest, in eastern Houston County, Texas. It was founded in the 1880s and was deserted by 1990.

References

Unincorporated communities in Texas
Houston County, Texas
1880s establishments in Texas